Laï is a city in Chad. It lies on the Logone River and is the capital of the region of Tandjilé.  The town is served by Laï Airport.

History
This city is notable for the Battle of Lai during World War I; in August 1914 the city was occupied by the German army until it was liberated by the French in September.

Demographics

References

Populated places in Chad
Tandjilé Region